The Hornsby Plateau is a dissected sandstone plateau lying to the north of Sydney Harbour that rises 200 metres. The plateau is a part of the larger Sydney Basin structure.

Geography
The North Shore and the Berowra Valley National Park are located on the Hornsby Plateau. It is separated from the Blue Mountains Plateau by the passage of the Colo River. The plateau rises from the Cumberland Plain in the south along a warp line increasing from the proximity of Cattai to Botany Bay. The plateau's elevation ranges between 200-220 metres, with gullies that fall 80-100 metres deep along drainage lines. Steep slopes with drastic ascension of over 100 metres are present. The soil type is generally lithosols, which has low fertility and is normally less than 500 mm deep.

Geology

Rock deposits in the Sydney area were tertiary freshwater sediments, which were a rough gravelly layer up to 8 metres thick located beneath silt and sand at a mean depth of 6 metres. As time went by, weathering transformed much of the sandy silt into siliceous clay. At the end of the Tertiary period, or about 80 million years ago, earth movements created an upheaval of 600 metres in most of coastal eastern Australia, due to the rifting and opening of the Tasman Sea. Thus, these movements created the Blue Mountains and Hornsby Plateaux, with the lagging behind of the peneplain becoming the Cumberland Plain.

The plateau was scoured by freshwater streams, which perforated a labyrinth of V-shaped valleys with intruding rocky ridges into the Hawkesbury Sandstone. The drainage activity is ascertained by the Hawkesbury Sandstone's impotence, which were employed by early watercourses. As the creeks carved deeper into the plateau, they began undercutting the sandstone walls of the valley, and as such, blocks of sandstone fell down, thus creating cliff lines.

Due to its hilly topography, the plateau was slow to develop. It has two main sedimentary rock layers: Hawkesbury sandstone, consisting mostly of sandstone, but with some shale, and the overlying Ashfield Shale, which supports richer vegetation. There are also a few volcanic intrusions throughout the plateau.

See also
Woronora Plateau

References

Landforms of New South Wales
Plateaus of Australia
Geography of Australia
Hornsby, New South Wales
Hornsby Shire
Geography of Sydney
Landforms of Sydney